Holm Island is an island in the River Thames in England on the reach above Penton Hook Lock, near Staines. It is on the Buckinghamshire bank, just upstream of Hollyhock Island.

A house on it known as "The Nest" was used as a hideaway by the future Edward VIII and Wallis Simpson during the 1930s.

See also
Islands in the River Thames

References

Islands of the River Thames